Alfelito "Alfel" Maraon Bascug is a Filipino politician. He currently serves as a member of the Philippine House of Representatives representing the 1st District of Agusan del Sur.

Political career

House of Representatives (2019–present)

References

External links 
 Official Facebook page

Living people
Members of the House of Representatives of the Philippines from Agusan del Sur
National Unity Party (Philippines) politicians
People from Agusan del Sur
Year of birth missing (living people)